Marceli Wiech (born 8 October 1954) is a Polish fencer. He competed in the individual and team épée events at the 1976 Summer Olympics.

References

1954 births
Living people
Polish male fencers
Olympic fencers of Poland
Fencers at the 1976 Summer Olympics
Sportspeople from Chorzów